György Csordás (October 6, 1928 – May 9, 2000) was a freestyle swimmer from Hungary, who competed in three consecutive Summer Olympics for his native country, starting in 1948.

His best individual result came in 1948, when he placed fourth in 1500 m freestyle.

At the European Championships in 1954 he became European champion in 400 m freestyle and in 1500 m freestyle.

References

1928 births
2000 deaths
Hungarian male swimmers
Olympic swimmers of Hungary
Hungarian male freestyle swimmers
Swimmers at the 1948 Summer Olympics
Swimmers at the 1952 Summer Olympics
Swimmers at the 1956 Summer Olympics
People from Cegléd
European Aquatics Championships medalists in swimming
European champions for Hungary
Sportspeople from Pest County